The London Purchase Farm, also known as the John Chapman House, is located on Eagle Road in Upper Makefield Township, Pennsylvania.  The house was listed on the National Register of Historic Places on January 24, 1974.

History 
A portion of the stone structure dates to circa 1735, however, the land was purchased by the London Land Company prior to 1718, thus the name London Purchase. At some point between 1718 and 1733 John Chapman purchased the land. This is known from a tax list of 1733 upon which his name appeared. In 1736, his name appears on a road survey. After his death in 1743, the property was willed to his son of the same name. During the American Revolution, the property served as headquarters for General Henry Knox and Captain Alexander Hamilton. The second John Chapman was a doctor as well as a farmer. Little is known about what occurred there during the nineteenth century.

From the 1930s to the 1950s the house was owned by Henry and Paula Chapin, and operated as a farm with the help of their children, Charlotte, Anthony and Penney.

In the summer of 1948, the owners rented the house to the Percival family. In 1957, the Nelson and Nondas Case bought the house and maintained ownership for three or four years. Mr. Henry Welling and 
Mr. & Mrs. John H. Welling owned the property and resided here from 1962–1966. Theodore N. Luz, wife Edith K. Luz, and their five children, Dennis, Nancy, Linda, Kristin and Michael occupied the home from 1966–1968. The James J. O'Brien family lived there in 1971.  In the 1980s, the Norman Flojo family owned the estate and continued to do so into the early 1990s.  Since then the house has been sold twice. The current owners built or are building an addition onto the house.  The property includes the main house, a barn, a carriage house, and a pond.

The O'Brien family owned the estate from August 1969 to October 1973. It was during this period that the estate was placed on the National Register of Historic Places.

Gallery

References

External links 

 

Farms on the National Register of Historic Places in Pennsylvania
Houses completed in 1735
Pennsylvania in the American Revolution
Houses in Bucks County, Pennsylvania
National Register of Historic Places in Bucks County, Pennsylvania